The Heritage was a one-off European Tour men's professional golf tournament contested during the 2004 European Tour season.  The event was sponsored by the International Management Group and was held in honour of Ken Schofield, who was stepping down as executive director of the European Tour after 30 years.

The Heritage was hosted on the Duke's Course at Woburn Golf and Country Club near Milton Keynes, England and offered a prize fund of €2,000,000. The winner was Henrik Stenson, who finished four strokes ahead of Carlos Rodiles.

Winners

References

External links
Event page on the official site of the European Tour

Former European Tour events
Golf tournaments in England
Sport in Buckinghamshire